The Litany of Humility is a Catholic prayer that the penitent be granted the virtue of humility. A litany is a form of prayer with a repeated responsive petition; it is not used in public liturgical services of the Catholic Church, but in private devotions of adherents.

This litany is commonly attributed to Cardinal Rafael Merry del Val (1865-1930), Cardinal Secretary of State of the Holy See under Pope Pius X. C.S. Lewis attributed its composition to Merry del Val in a March 1948 letter to Don Giovanni Calabria. Father Charles Belmonte was inspired by the writings of Merry del Val and included it in a collection, the Handbook of Prayers (Studium Theologiae Foundation, Manila, 1986, and in a later edition by Midwest Theological Forum, Chicago, US), and described it as "attributed to Card. Merry del Val". Subsequent copyists wrote simply: "by Card. Merry del Val".

A "Litany to Obtain Holy Humility" was published in 1867 by "A R.C. Clergyman". A version very similar to the version attributed to Cardinal Merry del Val was published in 1880, copyright 1879, and "translated from the French of the Fifth Edition." It appears Merry del Val was using a lesser known but already published prayer. The original author of the Litany of Humility is unknown.

A Ukrainian language version of the litany, attributed to the Russian Orthodox priest Alexander Men, appears in two prayer books: Molytovnyk Dl'a Rodyny (Prayer Book for the Family) published in L'viv in 2010 by Apriori; and Molytovnyk (Prayer Book), published in Kyiv in 2017 by Duh i Litera.

Litany of Humility

Contemporary Version

Litany to Obtain Holy Humility (1867)

Litany of Humility (1880)

See also

List of prayers
Litany

References

External links
 

Litanies
Humility